Vincent Augustine Zizak (August 8, 1908 – August 1973) was an American football offensive guard and professional wrestler. He played in the NFL for the Chicago Bears and Philadelphia Eagles across four seasons.

Early life
Vince Zizak was born on August 8, 1908, in Camden, New Jersey.

Football career
Vince Zizak played two games for the Chicago Bears before joining the Philadelphia Eagles. Zizak then played four seasons with the team, but only played 22 games. He also started six. In 1937, he played two games with the Eagles before joining the Rochester Tigers of the AFL II. Then, in 1938 he played for the Wilmington Clippers of the American Association.

Wrestling career
Zizak briefly was a professional wrestler in the winter of 1936.

References

1908 births
1973 deaths
Villanova Wildcats football players
Philadelphia Eagles players
Chicago Bears players
Players of American football from Camden, New Jersey
American football guards
American football tackles
Rochester Tigers players
Wilmington Clippers players